Ayot was a railway station serving  Ayot St Peter near Welwyn Garden City in Hertfordshire, England.  It was on the branch line to Dunstable.

History
Opened by the Great Northern Railway, it became part of the London and North Eastern Railway during the Grouping of 1923. The station then passed on to British Railways on nationalisation in 1948 but was closed by  British Railways that year when the station was destroyed by fire and never rebuilt.

The site today
The trackbed is now part of a local rail trail called Ayot Greenway.

References

External links
 Ayot station on navigable O. S. map
 Ayot station on disused-stations.org.uk

Disused railway stations in Hertfordshire
Former Great Northern Railway stations
Railway stations in Great Britain opened in 1877
Railway stations in Great Britain closed in 1948